The 1848 United States presidential election in Connecticut took place on November 7, 1848, as part of the 1848 United States presidential election. Voters chose six representatives, or electors to the Electoral College, who voted for President and Vice President.

Connecticut voted for the Whig candidate, Zachary Taylor, over Democratic candidate Lewis Cass and Free Soil Party candidate Martin Van Buren. Taylor won Connecticut by a margin of 5.24%.

Results

See also
 United States presidential elections in Connecticut

References

Connecticut
1848
1848 Connecticut elections